Mark Lawrence (born 4 December 1958) is an English former footballer who played as a midfielder for Hartlepool United from 1977 to 1984. He also represented Port Vale (on loan) and Whitby Town. He helped the "Valiants" to win promotion out of the Fourth Division in 1982–83.

Career
Lawrence began his career at Fourth Division side Hartlepool United, who were forced to apply for re-election to the Football League in the 1977–78 campaign. Billy Horner's "Pools" rose to 13th place in 1978–79, before dropping back down to 19th in 1979–80. They rose up to ninth place in 1980–81, then posted 14th and 22nd-place finishes in 1981–82 and 1982–83. Lawrence was loaned out to John McGrath's Port Vale in March 1983. He played eleven games, helping the "Valiants" to finish third and gain promotion from the Fourth Division in 1982–83. He left Vale Park and returned to Victoria Park in May. Hartlepool had to apply for re-election once again after finishing second-from-bottom in 1983–84; Lawrence then left Hartlepool and joined non-league Whitby Town.

Career statistics
Source:

Honours
Port Vale
Football League Fourth Division third-place promotion: 1982–83

References

1958 births
Living people
Footballers from Middlesbrough
English footballers
Association football midfielders
Hartlepool United F.C. players
Port Vale F.C. players
Whitby Town F.C. players
English Football League players